James Cochran Stevenson, JP (9 October 1825 – 11 January 1905) was a British industrialist at Tyneside and a Liberal politician who sat in the House of Commons from 1868 to 1895.

Life
Stevenson was born at Glasgow, the son of James Stevenson, a Glasgow merchant, and his wife, Jane Stewart Shannan (daughter of Alexander Shannan, a Greenock merchant). He was educated in Glasgow (where he was gold medalist in junior and senior mathematical classes), and at Glasgow University. 

The family moved to Jarrow in 1844 when his father became a partner in the Jarrow Chemical Company, which was an alkali works. After his father retired in 1854, James managed the company with one of his father's partners, John Williamson. Under their control it became the second largest chemical company in the UK.

Stevenson took an active part in civic life, campaigning for improvements in sanitation, road-widening, river Tyne development schemes and more. He was a Life Commissioner appointed by the Tyne Improvement Act, and chairman of the Tyne Pilotage Commissioners. He was mayor of South Shields and a J.P. for County Durham and for South Shields. He was Lieutenant-Colonel commanding the 3rd Durham Artillery Volunteers, a member of General Council of Glasgow and a Fellow of the Institute of Chemistry. He was also, for a time, the owner of the Shields Gazette.

At the 1868 general election Stevenson was elected as the Member of Parliament (MP) for South Shields. He held the seat until he retired from Parliament at the 1895 general election.

Stevenson died at the age of 79.

Legacy
Stevenson was a religious man with a strong sense of public duty and commitment to the local area, but his chemical works, using the Leblanc process, caused pollution and imposed harsh working conditions on employees, despite being the first Tyneside factory to offer a Saturday half holiday.

Family
Stevenson married Elisa Ramsay Anderson, daughter of Rev. James Anderson, D.D., of Morpeth in 1855. Their daughter Hilda was also an MP. She married Walter Runciman, 1st Viscount Runciman of Doxford (1870–1949), who was an important member of the Baldwin and Chamberlain governments in the 1930s. Another daughter, Louisa Mary, married Sir Kenneth Skelton Anderson, 1st Baronet of Ardtaraig (1866–1942), the son of the Rev. Alexander Anderson and Mary (Gavin) Anderson, of Aberdeenshire. He was the owner of the Orient Steam Navigation Company.

James Cochran Stevenson had nine siblings, including Flora Stevenson, J.J. Stevenson and Louisa Stevenson.

References

External links 
 

1825 births
1905 deaths
Liberal Party (UK) MPs for English constituencies
UK MPs 1868–1874
UK MPs 1874–1880
UK MPs 1880–1885
UK MPs 1885–1886
UK MPs 1886–1892
UK MPs 1892–1895
Mayors of places in North East England
19th-century British businesspeople
English justices of the peace